The Golden Salamander is a 1949 thriller novel by the British writer Victor Canning.

Film adaptation
In 1949 the novel was adapted into a film Golden Salamander directed by Ronald Neame and starring Trevor Howard, Anouk Aimée, and Herbert Lom.

References

Bibliography
 Goble, Alan. The Complete Index to Literary Sources in Film. Walter de Gruyter, 1999.

1949 British novels
British thriller novels
Novels set in Tunisia
British novels adapted into films
Novels by Victor Canning
Hodder & Stoughton books